The Ville-Marie borough council is the local governing body of Ville-Marie, a borough in the City of Montreal, Canada.

The Ville-Marie council has a different structure from all other Montreal borough councils. Before 2009, the council consisted of an elected borough mayor, two elected city councillors, and two elected borough councillors. Under legislation passed by the government of Quebec in 2008 and implemented after the 2009 municipal election, however, the council now consists of three elected city councillors, the mayor of Montreal (who automatically serves as mayor of Ville-Marie), and two councillors from other boroughs who are selected by the mayor. The current mayor of Ville-Marie is Denis Coderre, who was elected as mayor of Montreal in the 2013 Montreal municipal election.

At the first council meeting following the 2009 election, several members of the public expressed opposition to having a borough mayor and two councillors who were not locally elected.

Current members

References

Municipal government of Montreal
Ville-Marie, Montreal